Havelock may refer to:

People

As a surname
 Havelock-Allan baronets, holders of the baronetcy
 Sir Henry Havelock (1795–1857), British general, active in India
 Lieutenant General Sir Henry Havelock-Allan, 1st Baronet (1830–1897), British General and Member of Parliament (son of Sir Henry Havelock)
 Sir Henry Havelock-Allan, 2nd Baronet (1872–1953), British Liberal Party politician and Member of Parliament
 Sir Anthony Havelock-Allan, 4th Baronet (1904–2003), British film producer
 Sir (Anthony) Mark David Havelock-Allan, 5th Baronet (born 1951—see Havelock-Allan baronets), English Circuit Judge
 Sir Arthur Havelock (1844–1908), Governor of Tasmania, 1901–1904
 Brian Havelock (born 1942), English motorcycle speedway rider
 Eric A. Havelock (1903–1988), British (later Canadian and American) scholar
 Gary Havelock (born 1968), 1992 World Individual Speedway champion
 Harry Havelock (1901–1973), English professional footballer
 John E. Havelock (1932–2021), Alaska Attorney General from 1970 to 1973
 Jon Havelock, Alberta politician
 Sir Thomas Henry Havelock (1877–1968), English applied mathematician
 Tom Havelock, British singer-songwriter
 Wilfrid Havelock (1912–2003), Kenyan politician
 William Havelock (1793–1848), British cavalry officer (brother of Sir Henry Havelock)
 William Henry Havelock (1826–1876), Indian Civil Servant

As a given name
 Sir Havelock Charles (1858–1934), British doctor and Serjeant Surgeon to King George V
 Havelock Ellis (1859–1939), British physician and psychologist, writer, and social reformer who studied human sexuality
 Sir Havelock Hudson(1862–1944), British Indian Army officer
 Havelock Nelson (1917–1996), Irish composer and conductor
 Havelock Nelson (writer) (born 1964), American music journalist and author
 Havelock Wilson (1859–1929), British trade union leader and Liberal Party politician

Places

Australia 
 Havelock, Victoria, a small town north of Maryborough

Canada 
 Havelock, New Brunswick, an unincorporated community
 Havelock Parish, New Brunswick, a civil parish
 Havelock, Ontario, a village
 Havelock-Belmont-Methuen, Ontario, a township
 Havelock, Quebec, a town
 Havelock, Nova Scotia

India 
 Havelock Island, the largest of the islands in Ritchie's Archipelago, Andaman Islands

New Zealand 
 Havelock, New Zealand, a village
 Havelock North, New Zealand, a town
 Havelock North Wanderers, a football team
 Havelock North High School, a high school

Sri Lanka 
 Havelock City, a large residential project
 Havelock Town, a small town/area near the outskirts of Colombo

Swaziland 
 Bulembu (Havelock), a town

United States 
 Havelock, Iowa, a city
 Havelock, North Carolina, a city
 Havelock, North Dakota, an unincorporated community
 Havelock Township, Minnesota
 Havelock, Nebraska, a former town/current neighborhood of Lincoln, annexed in 1930

Literature 
 Havelok the Dane, a Middle English romance
 Havelock Vetinari, Patrician of Ankh-Morpork in the Discworld novels of Terry Pratchett
 Judy Havelock, a Bond girl in Ian Fleming's short story "For Your Eyes Only"

Other 
 Havelock Country Jamboree, country music festival held annually in rural Ontario
 HMS Havelock, several ships of Britain's Royal Navy
 A cloth cover for a kepi or military service cap, with a flap to protect the back of the neck, reportedly named after Sir Henry Havelock